José Antonio Díaz (born June 13, 1976) is a Mexican professional boxer. He's the former International Boxing Association light welterweight and WBO Latino light middleweight champion. Antonio is the brother of boxing trainer Joel Díaz and former IBF lightweight champion Julio Díaz.

Professional career
Among his 11 title defenses, Díaz holds wins over champions like Cory Spinks, Ivan Robinson, Micky Ward, Ahmed Santos, and Omar Gabriel Weis. His only losses have been to Juan Lazcano, Victor Ortiz, Shane Mosley and Antonio Margarito.

See also
List of boxing families

References

External links

People from Jiquilpan, Michoacán
Boxers from Michoacán
Light-middleweight boxers
Welterweight boxers
Light-welterweight boxers
1976 births
Living people
Mexican male boxers